State Road 127 (SR 127) is a short north–south highway in northeast corner of the U.S. state of Indiana between U.S. Route 20 (US 20) in Angola, Indiana and SR 120. Its present length was formerly a part of old US 27, whose designation was moved to the new Interstate 69 (I–69) when the freeway was completed in northern Indiana in 1967.

SR 127 is in fact a "child" of US 27; however, Indiana decommissioned all of US 27 north of Fort Wayne, so SR 127 no longer connects with US 27 anywhere. It functions in part to connect SR 120 to I–69 and, south of its interchange with I–69, it provides a local thoroughfare into Angola.  The last several miles of SR 127 north of Angola's town square are crowded with fast-food franchises and other national chains.

SR 127 also provides access, through the very short SR 727, to Pokagon State Park.

Route description

SR 127 southern terminus is at US 20.  SR 127 heads north as a two–lane highway passing through residential areas.  At Calvary Lane in Angola the road becomes a four–lane highway with a center turn lane.  At 200 North the road becomes a two–lane rural highway, passing farmland and woodlands.  North of Angola, SR 127 has an interchange with Interstate 69 (I-69).  Where SR 127 passes under I-69 heading west then at an intersection with SR 727, SR 127 turns north.  After SR 727, SR 127 is within a few hundred yards from I-69.

History

SR 127 was first authorized in 1931 between Pokagon State Park and US 27. Between late 1967 and early 1968 the road was extended north to SR 120, along the old route of US 27. In late 1968 or early 1969 the road was extended south to US 20 in Angola, along what had been US 27 before it was diverted to Interstate 69. The route from Pokagon State Park to SR 127 became SR 727 that this time.

Major intersections

References

External links

127
U.S. Route 27
Transportation in Steuben County, Indiana